The 1959 All-Ireland Senior Football Championship Final was the 72nd All-Ireland Final and the deciding match of the 1959 All-Ireland Senior Football Championship, an inter-county Gaelic football tournament for the top teams in Ireland. 

Kerry won easily with goals by Dan McAuliffe (2) and Garry McMahon.

It was the third of three All-Ireland football titles won by Kerry in the 1950s.

Galway were beaten by Kerry.

References

All-Ireland Senior Football Championship Finals
All-Ireland Senior Football Championship Final, 1959
All-Ireland Senior Football Championship Finals
All-Ireland Senior Football Championship Finals
Galway county football team matches
Kerry county football team matches